Nobody is a 1921 American silent mystery film directed by Roland West and starring Jewel Carmen, William B. Davidson and Kenneth Harlan.

Cast
 Jewel Carmen as Little Mrs. Smith
 William B. Davidson as John Rossmore
 Kenneth Harlan as Tom Smith
 Florence Billings as Mrs. Fallon
 J. Herbert Frank as Hedges
 Grace Studdiford as Mrs. Rossmore 
 George Fawcett as Hiram Swanzey
 Lionel Pape as Noron Ailsworth
 Henry Sedley as Rossmore's Secretary
 Ida Darling as Mrs. Van Cleek
 Charles Wellesley as Clyde Durand
 William De Grasse as Rossmore's Skipper
 Riley Hatch as The 'Grouch' Juror

References

Bibliography
 Munden, Kenneth White. The American Film Institute Catalog of Motion Pictures Produced in the United States, Part 1. University of California Press, 1997.

External links
 

1921 films
1921 mystery films
1920s English-language films
American silent feature films
American mystery films
American black-and-white films
Films directed by Roland West
First National Pictures films
1920s American films
Silent mystery films